"Roller" is a song recorded by German rapper Apache 207. The song was released by Four Music and TwoSides on 23 August 2019, as the lead single from Apache's debut EP Platte. The song was written by Apache 207 and produced by Lucry and Suena.

The song reached number one in Germany in its second week on the chart, becoming the rapper's first number-one hit there. It also went on to become the most streamed song in Germany in 2019. Additionally, the song peaked in the top-10 of the charts in Austria and Switzerland. In March 2020, the song was awarded the most successful record of 2019 by the academy of the German Music Authors' Prize, hosted by GEMA.

Critical reception
The editors of 16Bars stressed the song's use of "unique vocal efforts" paired with "catchy melodies" and Apache's "authentic showmanship". Laut.de praised the song for showcasing Apache's trademark qualities, including a "catchy hook" and "a good portion of self-deprecation".

Commercial performance
The song debuted at number two in Germany, behind Capital Bra's and Samra's Nummer eins, becoming the rapper's highest charting single. In its second week, for the chart dated 6 September 2019, the song reached number one. The song was certified diamond by the BVMI in July 2020, exceeding one million certified units in Germany. In doing so, the song became only the fourth German rap song to reach that threshold. By 30 September 2020, the song had amassed 221 million streams on Spotify, surpassing Rammstein's "Du hast" (1997) as the most streamed German song of all time on the streaming service.

Music video
The accompanying music video was released on 23 August 2019. It mainly features the rapper, dressed in white Nike socks and sneakers, with his crew riding motorcycles. The final scene shows Apache running through a street of his home town while also alluding to the title of his then upcoming debut EP Platte. The video surpassed 40 million views by the end of 2019.

Personnel
Credits adapted from Tidal.
 Apache 207 – vocals, songwriting
 Lucry – composition, production, mixing engineering
 Suena – composition, production, mixing engineering
 Lex Barkey – mastering engineering

Charts

Weekly charts

Year-end charts

Certifications

See also
 List of number-one hits of 2019 (Germany)

References

2019 singles
2019 songs
German-language songs
Number-one singles in Germany